Year 929 (CMXXIX) was a common year starting on Thursday (link will display the full calendar) of the Julian calendar.

Events 
 By place 

 Europe 
 January 16 – Emir Abd-al-Rahman III of Córdoba proclaims himself caliph and creates the Caliphate of Córdoba. He breaks his allegiance to, and ties with, the Fatimid and Abbasid caliphs.
 February 3 – Guy (the Philosopher) of Tuscany, second husband (third lover) of the Roman noblewoman Marozia, dies. He is succeeded by his brother Lambert as margrave of Tuscany.
 Early 929 – Siege of Gana: German king Henry I (the Fowler) besieges Gana with an East Frankish army and conquers the stronghold. He establishes the fort of Meissen nearby.
 Early 929 –Henry the Fowler invades Bohemia from the north and marches on Prague. Duke Arnulf I of Bavaria invades Bohemia from the south. The Bohemians capitulate.
 Summer – The Slavic-Arab leader Sabir defeats a small Byzantine fleet and seizes Termoli (in Molise, on the Adriatic coast). He returns to Africa laden with booty and slaves.
 September 4 – Battle of Lenzen: Slavic forces (the Redarii and the Obotrites) are defeated by a Saxon army near the fortified stronghold of Lenzen (modern Germany).
 October 7 – Former king Charles III (the Simple) dies in prison at Péronne, leaving Rudolph with no opposition except that of Herbert II, count of Vermandois.

 Asia 
 Mpu Sindok, ruler of the Mataram Kingdom, moves his court from Central Java to East Java (modern Indonesia). Probably after the eruption of Mount Merapi and/or invasion from Srivijaya.

 By topic 

 Religion 
 Pope Leo VI dies at Rome after a 7-month reign. He is succeeded (probably handpicked–by Marozia from the Tusculani family) by Stephen VII as the 124th pope of the Catholic Church.

Births 
 September 29 – Qian Chu, king of Wuyue (d. 988)
 At-Ta'i, Abbasid caliph of Baghdad (d. 1003)
 Fujiwara no Kaneie, Japanese statesman (d. 990)
 Guo Zhongshu, Chinese painter (approximate date)
 Kishi Joō, Japanese female waka poet (d. 985)
 William, archbishop of Mainz (d. 968)

Deaths 
 January 28 – Gao Jixing, founder of Chinese Jingnan (b. 858)
 February 3 – Guy (the Philosopher), margrave of Tuscany (Italy)
 March 26 – Wang Du, Chinese warlord and governor (jiedushi)
 June 7 – Ælthryth, English princess and countess of Flanders (b. 877)
 October 7 – Charles III (the Simple), Frankish king (b. 879)
 Abu Ali al-Husayn ibn Ahmad al-Madhara'i, Abbasid fiscal director
 Abu'l-Musafir al-Fath, Sajid emir of Azerbaijan (Iran)
 Al-Batani, Muslim astronomer and mathematician
 Ashot II, king of Armenia (approximate date)
 Cui Xie, Chinese official and chancellor
 Gao Yu, Chinese chief strategist
 Indra III, ruler of Rashtrakuta (India)
 Leo VI, pope of the Catholic Church
 Lothar I, Frankish nobleman (b. 902)
 Lothar II, Frankish nobleman (b. 874)
 Padla II, prince of Kakheti (Georgia)
 Sancho Ordóñez, king of Galicia (Spain)
 Thumal the Qahraman, Abbasid female judge
 Zhao Jingyi, Chinese general and governor

References